Joe Miller Ballpark is a baseball venue in Lake Charles, Louisiana, United States.  It is home to the McNeese State Cowboys baseball team of the NCAA Division I Southland Conference.  Opened in 1965, the venue has a capacity of 2,000 spectators.  Its record attendance came one May 2, 2000, when 2,191 spectators saw McNeese State defeat LSU 4–3 in 11 innings.  The facility was renovated in 2005, 2007, and 2008. Not to be confused with Joe Miller Field, which is McNeese's softball venue.

Renovations 
In 2005, a Daktronics scoreboard with a message board was installed.  In 2007, a new outfield fence was built after the old fence was destroyed by Hurricane Rita.  In 2008, new chairback seating (behind home plate) and bleacher seating (along the first and third baselines) were installed.  Additionally, the infield was laser-leveled and wheelchair accessibility was improved with new ramps to the venue's seating areas.

In 2014, the first part of a multi-phase upgrade began with installation of infield turf.  According to the project announcement, "...The new surface will make up the entire infield and foul territories and includes the batter's area and baselines. The only dirt on the field will be the pitcher's mound..."  Joseph T. Miller, Sr. presented the McNeese Foundation a check for $300,000 to help finance the infield turf project. Future planned upgrades announced include a new entrance court and ticket booths, elevated deck seating, VIP seating, and new fencing.

See also
 List of NCAA Division I baseball venues

References

External links
Cowboy Diamond photo gallery at mcneesesports.com

Baseball venues in Louisiana
College baseball venues in the United States
Buildings and structures in Lake Charles, Louisiana
Sports venues completed in 1965
McNeese Cowboys baseball
Sports venues in Lake Charles, Louisiana
1965 establishments in Louisiana